Thomas Freke (c. 1638–1701), of Shroton and Melcombe Horsey, Dorset, was an English politician.

He was born the third son of John Freke of Cerne Abbey, Dorset and his second wife Jane Shurley and studied at the Middle Temple.

He was a Member (MP) of the Parliament of England for Dorset in the periods March 1679 – March 1681, 1685–1687 and 1689 – November 1701 and was picked High Sheriff of Dorset for 1633–34.

He married Cicely, the daughter of Robert Hussey of Stourpaine, Dorset but had no children.

See also
Thomas Freke (1660–1721)

References

1638 births
1701 deaths
Politicians from Dorset
Members of the Middle Temple
English MPs 1679
English MPs 1680–1681
English MPs 1685–1687
English MPs 1689–1690
English MPs 1690–1695
English MPs 1695–1698
English MPs 1698–1700
High Sheriffs of Dorset